The Pequea Valley School District is a school district of 1,589 students educated in 4 schools by 127 teachers in Lancaster County, Pennsylvania in the United States.  It is a member of Lancaster-Lebanon Intermediate Unit (IU) 13.

District Schools

Paradise Elementary School
Paradise Elementary School in Paradise, Pennsylvania is a K-6 facility in the Pequea Valley School District. In 2009, a new building was constructed adjacent to the old building. This new facility has features specifically added to try to limit resource consumption, such as auto-dimming lights and water fountains that use collected rainwater. Recently however, there have been talks of a new building project that would increase the number of classrooms to accommodate the many new students in the area.

Salisbury Elementary School
Salisbury Elementary School is a K-6 facility in the Pequea Valley School District. It houses around 360 students. Attendance at Salisbury Elementary School in Gap, Pennsylvania during the 2005–2006 school year was 96.11%, essentially the same as the 96.04% scored in the prior year. Students were 81.8% proficient in math, 72.9% proficient in reading.

Pequea Valley Intermediate School
The PV Intermediate school is a facility for 7-8 grade students. There is approximately 255 attending. Attendance at Pequea Valley Intermediate School in Kinzers, Pennsylvania during the 2005–2006 school year was 96.10%, essentially the same as the 95.54% scored in the prior year. Students were 71.1% proficient in math, 69.5% proficient in reading.

Pequea Valley High School
Attendance at Pequea Valley High School in Kinzers, Pennsylvania during the 2005–2006 school year was 92.91%, somewhat higher than the 87.97% scored in the prior year. Students were 57.1% proficient in math, 73.4% proficient in reading.

There are plans to retire both the intermediate school building and senior high school building for a new school building in their place, housing grades 7–12. The building is expected to be finished by 2025.

Sports
Pequea Valley High School's Varsity soccer team holds the 2012 State Championship title.

See also
 Official website

References

School districts in Lancaster County, Pennsylvania